Hypereides (Ύπερείδες), son of Androgenes was an Attic potter, active in Athens around 560 BC.
He is known from his signature on two of the earliest Panathenaic prize amphorae, both found at Athens: Kerameikos PA 443 and Agora P 10204 .

Bibliography
 Martin Bentz: Panathenäische Preisamphoren. Eine athenische Vasengattung und ihre Funktion vom 6. - 4. Jahrhundert v. Chr., Basel 1998, p. 123 Nr. 6.004-6.005.
 Künstlerlexikon der Antike Vol. 1, 2001, p. 331-332 s.v. Hypereides (Rainer Vollkommer)

Ancient Greek potters